Olacapato is a village and rural municipality in Salta Province in northwestern Argentina. Olacapato is one of the highest towns in Argentina (4,090 m). The previous census of 2001 indicated a population of 186 inhabitants (INDEC, 2001),  appearing as a rural dispersed population.

Climate

See also
Salta–Antofagasta railway

References

Populated places in Salta Province